PCIA may refer to:

 Parent-Child Interaction Assessment-II (PCIA-II)
 Phenol–chloroform extraction
 People's Commissariat for Internal Affairs
 PCIA - The Wireless Infrastructure Association